Glitz is a Latin American pay television channel that was launched on 1 May 2011, replacing Fashion TV, after the license agreement between the French channel and the now-Glitz* parent Warner Bros. Discovery International (division of Warner Bros. Discovery), who purchased the channel from Claxson in 2007, ended in 2011. Its programming is women-centred.

Programming

Current programming
 Casos de Familia
 ¿Quien Tiene la Razon?
 El Chateo
 Cartas del Corazón
 Salvador de mujeres
 Sabor a ti

Past programming
 4Real
 Acorralada
 Alma Indomable
 Amor secreto
 Ángel Rebelde
 Arquitecto de sueños
 Arroz Con Leche
 Aunque mal paguen
 Behind the Lens
 Besos robados
 Chef Academy
 The Creators Project (Specials)
 Condesa por amor
 Cosita Linda
 Corazón esmeralda
 Corazón Indomable
 Demente Criminal
 Doña Bárbara
 El amor las vuelve locas
 El árbol de Gabriel
 El Dandy
 El Palenque con Enrique Santos
 El Sexo Debil
 Entre tu amor y mi amor
 Eva Luna
 The Fashion Show
 Gata Salvaje
 Gossip Girl
 Glamour Puds
 Icons: Big Star Profiles
 In the House with Peter Bart & Peter Guber
 La revista de Zuleika
 La ronca de oro
 La vida entera
 Los hombres también lloran
 Los secretos de Lucía
 Mambo y canela
 Marta Susana
 Mi Vida Eres Tú
 My City My Life
 Nuevo Rico Nuevo Pobre
 The O.C.
 Oye bonita
 Pablo Escobar, El Patrón
 Palabra Final
 Para verte mejor
 Pecadora
 Pobre millonaria Pop Profiles Rafael Orozco, el ídolo Rebeca Rosario Roxanna Sacrificio de Mujer School of Saatchi Spain... on the Road Again Sueño con tu Amor Take Away My Takeaway Torrente Tu Día Alegre Un Día Con... / Um Dia Com... Valeria ¿Vieja yo?Original programming
 Glam 
 GPS: Guiados Pelo Sabor (seen only in Brazil)
 Lado H On Top Project Runway Latin America Sexo no Sofá (seen only in Brazil)
 Taste It! UpdateAcquired programming
 All on the Line with Joe Zee America's Next Great Restaurant The Carrie Diaries 
 Hart of Dixie Iconoclasts Live from Abbey Road Live from the Artists Den The Lying Game  The Marriage Ref MasterChef (U.S.) The Millionaire Matchmaker Nail Files Peter Perfect Pretty Little Liars Project Runway (U.S.) The Rachel Zoe Project Rizzoli & Isles Style and the City Styled to Rock (UK) Work of Art: The Next Great Artist''

References

External links
 Glitz* official website 

Television channels and stations established in 2011
Defunct television channels in Brazil
Warner Bros. Discovery networks

Warner Bros. Discovery Americas